Teatro La Gran Guardia is the main theatre of Livorno, Italy, opened in 1955.

References

Livorno